The Feast of the Seven Fishes is an Italian-American celebration of Christmas Eve with dishes of fish and other seafood.

Origins and tradition
The Feast of the Seven Fishes is part of the Italian-American Christmas Eve celebration, although it is not called that in Italy. It is not a "feast" in the sense of "holiday", but rather a grand meal. Christmas Eve is a vigil or fasting day, and the abundance of seafood reflects the observance of abstinence from meat until the feast of Christmas Day itself.

Today, the Feast of the Seven Fishes typically consists of seven different seafood dishes. The tradition comes from Southern Italy, where it is known as The Vigil (La Vigilia). This celebration commemorates the wait, the Vigilia di Natale, for the midnight birth of the baby Jesus. The long tradition of eating seafood on Christmas Eve dates from the Roman Catholic tradition of abstaining from eating meat on the eve of a feast day. As no meat or animal fat could be used on such days, observant Catholics would instead eat fish (typically fried in oil). It is unclear when or where the term "Feast of the Seven Fishes" was popularized. The first known mention is in The Philadelphia Inquirer in 1983.

The meal includes seven or more fishes that are considered traditional. "Seven fishes" as a fixed concept or name is unknown in Italy. In some Italian-American families, there is no count of the number of fish dishes. A well-known dish is baccalà (salted cod fish). The custom of celebrating with a simple fish such as baccalà reflects customs in what were historically impoverished regions of Southern Italy, as well as seasonal factors. Fried smelts, calamari and other types of seafood have been incorporated into the Christmas Eve dinner over the years.

The number seven may come from the seven Sacraments of the  Catholic Church, or the seven hills of Rome, or some other source. There is no general agreement on its meaning.

Typical feast
The meal's components may include some combination of anchovies, whiting, lobster, sardines, baccalà (dried salt cod), smelts, eels, squid, octopus, shrimp, mussels and clams. The menu may also include pasta, vegetables, baked goods and wine.

Popular dishes

Baccalà with pasta, as a salad, or fried
Baked cod
Clams casino
Cod fish balls in tomato sauce
dolphinfish
Deep fried calamari
Deep fried cod
Deep fried fish/shrimp
Deep fried scallops
Fried smelts
Insalata di mare (seafood salad)
Linguine with anchovy, clam, lobster, tuna, or crab sauce
Marinated or fried eel
Octopus salad
Oyster shooters
Puttanesca with anchovies
Scungilli salad
Shrimp cocktail
Stuffed calamari in tomato sauce
Stuffed-baked lobsters
Stuffed-baked quahogs
Whiting

In popular culture
The graphic novel Feast of the Seven Fishes, written by Robert Tinnell (2005), has been made into a feature film also titled Feast of the Seven Fishes, featuring Madison Iseman and Skyler Gisondo, released 15 November 2019.
In the Golden Girls episode "Have Yourself a Very Little Christmas" Sophia mentions that fried eel is a customary Christmas tradition in many Italian (Sicilian) households. She goes on to say "In Sicily it wouldn't be Christmas without eels and larks." Fried, steamed or dried eel is usually one of the fish included in the "Seven Fishes" tradition, though many Italians and Sicilians in particular simply refer to it as the vigil or Christmas dinner; a meal typically free of red meat and consisting entirely of seafood.
Iron Chef Showdown had the feast of the seven fishes as a secret ingredient

See also
 Italian-American cuisine
 List of Christmas dishes
 List of dining events

References

External links
Christmas Eve Dinner
Feast of the Seven Fishes blog: A weblog about this Italian Christmas Eve tradition 
 Traditional Christmas Sweets
Christmas Eve Fish Dinner
The feast of the 7 (or 13) fishes (Italian and English)

Christmas meals and feasts
Italian-American cuisine
Italian-American culture in New York City
Fish as food